Stephen Foster State Park may refer to:
Stephen Foster Folk Culture Center State Park in White Springs, Florida
Stephen C. Foster State Park in Georgia